Julian Schmid may refer to:
 Julian Schmid (politician)
 Julian Schmid (skier)

See also
 Julian Schmidt (disambiguation)